Kubota is a Japanese surname. In Japanese, it means sunken rice paddy (窪, kubo, sink + 田, ta, rice paddy), but is usually written phonetically (久, ku, long time + 保, ho/bo, protect + 田, ta, rice paddy). Notable people with the surname include:

Kazuteru Kubota, a.k.a. Koriki Chōshū, comedian
, Japanese gymnast
Mantarō Kubota, Japanese author
, Japanese Nordic combined skier
, Japanese voice actress and idol
Rena Kubota, Japanese shootboxer
Risa Kubota, Japanese voice actress
Ryo Kubota (disambiguation), multiple people
Shigeko Kubota, visual and performance artist
Takayuki Kubota, Japanese martial artist and inventor
Toshinobu Kubota, Japanese singer
Yoshiyuki Kubota, Japanese shogi player
, Japanese actor and model

Fictional characters
Dr. Kubota, the main antagonist in the game Ordyne
Shinpei Kubota, a supporting character in the manga series Gender-Swap at the Delinquent Academy
Miko Kubota, one of the two main characters in the animated streaming television series Glitch Techs

References

Japanese-language surnames